Christian Kruik van Adrichem, or Christianus Crucius Adrichomius, (February 13, 1533 – June 20, 1585) was a Catholic priest and theological writer.

Biography
Van Adrichem was born in Delft. He died in Cologne.

His works are: Vita Jesu Christi (Antwerp, 1578) and Theatrum Terrae Sanctae et Biblicarum Historiarum (Cologne, 1590). This last work gives a description of Palestine, of the antiquities of Jerusalem, and a chronology from Adam till the death of John the Apostle in 109.

Gallery from original 1590 edition of Theatrum Terrae Sanctae et Biblicarum Historiarum

References

16th-century Dutch Roman Catholic theologians
1533 births
1585 deaths
16th-century Dutch Roman Catholic priests
People from Delft